An interpretation of quantum mechanics is an attempt to explain how the mathematical theory of quantum mechanics might correspond to experienced reality. Although quantum mechanics has held up to rigorous and extremely precise tests in an extraordinarily broad range of experiments, there exist a number of contending schools of thought over their interpretation.  These views on interpretation differ on such fundamental questions as whether quantum mechanics is deterministic or stochastic, local or non-local, which elements of quantum mechanics can be considered real, and what the nature of measurement is, among other matters.

Despite nearly a century of debate and experiment, no consensus has been reached among physicists and philosophers of physics concerning which interpretation best "represents" reality.

History 

The definition of quantum theorists' terms, such as wave function and matrix mechanics, progressed through many stages. For instance, Erwin Schrödinger originally viewed the electron's wave function as its charge density smeared across space, but Max Born reinterpreted the absolute square value of the wave function as the electron's probability density distributed across space.

The views of several early pioneers of quantum mechanics, such as Niels Bohr and Werner Heisenberg, are often grouped together as the "Copenhagen interpretation", though physicists and historians of physics have argued that this terminology obscures differences between the views so designated. Copenhagen-type ideas were never universally embraced, and challenges to a perceived Copenhagen orthodoxy gained increasing attention in the 1950s with the pilot-wave interpretation of David Bohm and the many-worlds interpretation of Hugh Everett III.

The physicist N. David Mermin once quipped, "New interpretations appear every year. None ever disappear." As a rough guide to development of the mainstream view during the 1990s and 2000s, a "snapshot" of opinions was collected in a poll by Schlosshauer et al. at the "Quantum Physics and the Nature of Reality" conference of July 2011.
The authors reference a similarly informal poll carried out by Max Tegmark at the "Fundamental Problems in Quantum Theory" conference in August 1997. The main conclusion of the authors is that "the Copenhagen interpretation still reigns supreme", receiving the most votes in their poll (42%), besides the rise to mainstream notability of the many-worlds interpretations: "The Copenhagen interpretation still reigns supreme here,  especially if we lump it together with intellectual offsprings such as information-based interpretations and the Quantum Bayesian interpretation.  In Tegmark's poll, the Everett interpretation received 17% of the vote, which is similar to the number of votes (18%) in our poll."

Some concepts originating from studies of interpretations have found more practical application in quantum information science.

Nature 
More or less, all interpretations of quantum mechanics share two qualities:
 They interpret a formalism—a set of equations and principles to generate predictions via input of initial conditions
 They interpret a phenomenology—a set of observations, including those obtained by empirical research and those obtained informally, such as humans' experience of an unequivocal world
Two qualities vary among interpretations:
 Epistemology—claims about the possibility, scope, and means toward relevant knowledge of the world
 Ontology—claims about what things, such as categories and entities, exist in the world
In philosophy of science, the distinction of knowledge versus reality is termed epistemic versus ontic.  A general law is a regularity of outcomes (epistemic), whereas a causal mechanism may regulate the outcomes (ontic).  A phenomenon can receive interpretation either ontic or epistemic.  For instance, indeterminism may be attributed to limitations of human observation and perception (epistemic), or may be explained as a real existing maybe encoded in the universe (ontic).  Confusing the epistemic with the ontic, if for example one were to presume that a general law actually "governs" outcomes—and that the statement of a regularity has the role of a causal mechanism—is a category mistake.

In a broad sense, scientific theory can be viewed as offering scientific realism—approximately true description or explanation of the natural world—or might be perceived with antirealism.  A realist stance seeks the epistemic and the ontic, whereas an antirealist stance seeks epistemic but not the ontic.  In the 20th century's first half, antirealism was mainly logical positivism, which sought to exclude unobservable aspects of reality from scientific theory.

Since the 1950s, antirealism is more modest, usually instrumentalism, permitting talk of unobservable aspects, but ultimately discarding the very question of realism and posing scientific theory as a tool to help humans make predictions, not to attain metaphysical understanding of the world.  The instrumentalist view is carried by the famous quote of David Mermin, "Shut up and calculate", often misattributed to Richard Feynman.

Other approaches to resolve conceptual problems introduce new mathematical formalism, and so propose alternative theories with their interpretations.  An example is Bohmian mechanics, whose empirical equivalence with the three standard formalisms—Schrödinger's wave mechanics, Heisenberg's matrix mechanics, and Feynman's path integral formalism—has been demonstrated.

Interpretive challenges 

 Abstract, mathematical nature of quantum field theories: the mathematical structure of quantum mechanics is abstract without clear interpretation of its quantities.
 Existence of apparently indeterministic and irreversible processes: in classical field theory, a physical property at a given location in the field is readily derived.  In most mathematical formulations of quantum mechanics, measurement is given a special role in the theory, as it is the sole process that can cause a nonunitary, irreversible evolution of the state. 
 Role of the observer in determining outcomes: the Copenhagen-type interpretations imply that the wavefunction is a calculational tool, and represents reality only immediately after a measurement, perhaps performed by an observer; Everettian interpretations grant that all the possibilities can be real, and that the process of measurement-type interactions cause an effective branching process.
 Classically unexpected correlations between remote objects: entangled quantum systems, as illustrated in the EPR paradox, obey statistics that seem to violate principles of local causality.
 Complementarity of proffered descriptions: complementarity holds that no set of classical physical concepts can simultaneously refer to all properties of a quantum system.  For instance, wave description A and particulate description B can each describe quantum system S, but not simultaneously. This implies the composition of physical properties of S does not obey the rules of classical propositional logic when using propositional connectives (see "Quantum logic").  Like contextuality, the "origin of complementarity lies in the non-commutativity of operators" that describe quantum objects (Omnès 1999).
 Rapidly rising intricacy, far exceeding humans' present calculational capacity, as a system's size increases: since the state space of a quantum system is exponential in the number of subsystems, it is difficult to derive classical approximations.
 Contextual behaviour of systems locally: Quantum contextuality demonstrates that classical intuitions, in which properties of a system hold definite values independent of the manner of their measurement, fail even for local systems. Also, physical principles such as Leibniz's Principle of the identity of indiscernibles no longer apply in the quantum domain, signalling that most classical intuitions may be incorrect about the quantum world.

Influential interpretations

Copenhagen interpretation 

The Copenhagen interpretation is a collection of views about the meaning of quantum mechanics principally attributed to Niels Bohr and Werner Heisenberg. It is one of the oldest attitudes towards quantum mechanics, as features of it date to the development of quantum mechanics during 1925–1927, and it remains one of the most commonly taught. There is no definitive historical statement of what is the Copenhagen interpretation, and there were in particular fundamental disagreements between the views of Bohr and Heisenberg. For example, Heisenberg emphasized a sharp "cut" between the observer (or the instrument) and the system being observed, while Bohr offered an interpretation that is independent of a subjective observer or measurement or collapse, which relies on an "irreversible" or effectively irreversible process which imparts the classical behavior of "observation" or "measurement".

Features common to Copenhagen-type interpretations include the idea that quantum mechanics is intrinsically indeterministic, with probabilities calculated using the Born rule, and the principle of complementarity, which states that objects have certain pairs of complementary properties which cannot all be observed or measured simultaneously. Moreover, the act of "observing" or "measuring" an object is irreversible, no truth can be attributed to an object except according to the results of its measurement. Copenhagen-type interpretations hold that quantum descriptions are objective, in that they are independent of physicists' mental arbitrariness. The statistical interpretation of wavefunctions due to Max Born differs sharply from Schrödinger's original intent, which was to have a theory with continuous time evolution and in which wavefunctions directly described physical reality.

Many worlds 

The many-worlds interpretation is an interpretation of quantum mechanics in which a universal wavefunction obeys the same deterministic, reversible laws at all times; in particular there is no (indeterministic and irreversible) wavefunction collapse associated with measurement. The phenomena associated with measurement are claimed to be explained by decoherence, which occurs when states interact with the environment. More precisely, the parts of the wavefunction describing observers become increasingly entangled with the parts of the wavefunction describing their experiments. Although all possible outcomes of experiments continue to lie in the wavefunction's support, the times at which they become correlated with observers effectively "split" the universe into mutually unobservable alternate histories.

Quantum information theories 
Quantum informational approaches have attracted growing support.  They subdivide into two kinds.
 Information ontologies, such as J. A. Wheeler's "it from bit". These approaches have been described as a revival of immaterialism.
 Interpretations where quantum mechanics is said to describe an observer's knowledge of the world, rather than the world itself. This approach has some similarity with Bohr's thinking. Collapse (also known as reduction) is often interpreted as an observer acquiring information from a measurement, rather than as an objective event. These approaches have been appraised as similar to instrumentalism. James Hartle writes,
The state is not an objective property of an individual system but is that information, obtained from a knowledge of how a system was prepared, which can be used for making predictions about future measurements.
...A quantum mechanical state being a summary of the observer's information about an individual physical system changes both by dynamical laws, and whenever the observer acquires new information about the system through the process of measurement. The existence of two laws for the evolution of the state vector...becomes problematical only if it is believed that the state vector is an objective property of the system...The "reduction of the wavepacket" does take place in the consciousness of the observer, not because of any unique physical process which takes place there, but only because the state is a construct of the observer and not an objective property of the physical system.

Relational quantum mechanics 

The essential idea behind relational quantum mechanics, following the precedent of special relativity, is that different observers may give different accounts of the same series of events: for example, to one observer at a given point in time, a system may be in a single, "collapsed" eigenstate, while to another observer at the same time, it may be in a superposition of two or more states.  Consequently, if quantum mechanics is to be a complete theory, relational quantum mechanics argues that the notion of "state" describes not the observed system itself, but the relationship, or correlation, between the system and its observer(s).  The state vector of conventional quantum mechanics becomes a description of the correlation of some degrees of freedom in the observer, with respect to the observed system.  However, it is held by relational quantum mechanics that this applies to all physical objects, whether or not they are conscious or macroscopic. Any "measurement event" is seen simply as an ordinary physical interaction, an establishment of the sort of correlation discussed above.  Thus the physical content of the theory has to do not with objects themselves, but the relations between them.

QBism 

QBism, which originally stood for "quantum Bayesianism", is an interpretation of quantum mechanics that takes an agent's actions and experiences as the central concerns of the theory. This interpretation is distinguished by its use of a subjective Bayesian account of probabilities to understand the quantum mechanical Born rule as a normative addition to good decision-making. QBism draws from the fields of quantum information and Bayesian probability and aims to eliminate the interpretational conundrums that have beset quantum theory.

QBism deals with common questions in the interpretation of quantum theory about the nature of wavefunction superposition, quantum measurement, and entanglement. According to QBism, many, but not all, aspects of the quantum formalism are subjective in nature. For example, in this interpretation, a quantum state is not an element of reality—instead it represents the degrees of belief an agent has about the possible outcomes of measurements. For this reason, some philosophers of science have deemed QBism a form of anti-realism. The originators of the interpretation disagree with this characterization, proposing instead that the theory more properly aligns with a kind of realism they call "participatory realism", wherein reality consists of more than can be captured by any putative third-person account of it.

Consistent histories 

The consistent histories interpretation generalizes the conventional Copenhagen interpretation and attempts to provide a natural interpretation of quantum cosmology. The theory is based on a consistency criterion that allows the history of a system to be described so that the probabilities for each history obey the additive rules of classical probability. It is claimed to be consistent with the Schrödinger equation.

According to this interpretation, the purpose of a quantum-mechanical theory is to predict the relative probabilities of various alternative histories (for example, of a particle).

Ensemble interpretation 

The ensemble interpretation, also called the statistical interpretation, can be viewed as a minimalist interpretation. That is, it claims to make the fewest assumptions associated with the standard mathematics. It takes the statistical interpretation of Born to the fullest extent. The interpretation states that the wave function does not apply to an individual systemfor example, a single particlebut is an abstract statistical quantity that only applies to an ensemble (a vast multitude) of similarly prepared systems or particles. In the words of Einstein:

The most prominent current advocate of the ensemble interpretation is Leslie E. Ballentine, professor at Simon Fraser University, author of the text book Quantum Mechanics, A Modern Development.

De Broglie–Bohm theory 

The de Broglie–Bohm theory of quantum mechanics (also known as the pilot wave theory) is a theory by Louis de Broglie and extended later by David Bohm to include measurements.  Particles, which always have positions, are guided by the wavefunction.  The wavefunction evolves according to the Schrödinger wave equation, and the wavefunction never collapses. The theory takes place in a single spacetime, is non-local, and is deterministic. The simultaneous determination of a particle's position and velocity is subject to the usual uncertainty principle constraint. The theory is considered to be a hidden-variable theory, and by embracing non-locality it satisfies Bell's inequality. The measurement problem is resolved, since the particles have definite positions at all times. Collapse is explained as phenomenological.

Quantum Darwinism 

Quantum Darwinism is a theory meant to explain the emergence of the classical world from the quantum world as due to a process of Darwinian natural selection induced by the environment interacting with the quantum system; where the many possible quantum states are selected against in favor of a stable pointer state. It was proposed in 2003 by Wojciech Zurek and a group of collaborators including Ollivier, Poulin, Paz and Blume-Kohout. The development of the theory is due to the integration of a number of Zurek's research topics pursued over the course of twenty-five years including: pointer states, einselection and decoherence.

Transactional interpretation 

The transactional interpretation of quantum mechanics (TIQM) by John G. Cramer is an interpretation of quantum mechanics inspired by the Wheeler–Feynman absorber theory. It describes the collapse of the wave function as resulting from a time-symmetric transaction between a possibility wave from the source to the receiver (the wave function) and a possibility wave from the receiver to source (the complex conjugate of the wave function).  This interpretation of quantum mechanics is unique in that it not only views the wave function as a real entity, but the complex conjugate of the wave function, which appears in the Born rule for calculating the expected value for an observable, as also real.

Objective-collapse theories 

Objective-collapse theories differ from the Copenhagen interpretation by regarding both the wave function and the process of collapse as ontologically objective (meaning these exist and occur independent of the observer).  In objective theories, collapse occurs either randomly ("spontaneous localization") or when some physical threshold is reached, with observers having no special role.  Thus, objective-collapse theories are realistic, indeterministic, no-hidden-variables theories.  Standard quantum mechanics does not specify any mechanism of collapse; QM would need to be extended if objective collapse is correct. The requirement for an extension to QM means that objective collapse is more of a theory than an interpretation.  Examples include 
 the Ghirardi–Rimini–Weber theory
 the continuous spontaneous localization model
 the Penrose interpretation

Von Neumann–Wigner interpretation 

In his treatise The Mathematical Foundations of Quantum Mechanics, John von Neumann deeply analyzed the so-called measurement problem. He concluded that the entire physical universe could be made subject to the Schrödinger equation (the universal wave function). He also described how measurement could cause a collapse of the wave function. This point of view was prominently expanded on by Eugene Wigner, who argued that human experimenter consciousness (or maybe even dog consciousness) was critical for the collapse, but he later abandoned this interpretation.

Quantum logic 

Quantum logic can be regarded as a kind of propositional logic suitable for understanding the apparent anomalies regarding quantum measurement, most notably those concerning composition of measurement operations of complementary variables. This research area and its name originated in the 1936 paper by Garrett Birkhoff and John von Neumann, who attempted to reconcile some of the apparent inconsistencies of classical boolean logic with the facts related to measurement and observation in quantum mechanics.

Modal interpretations of quantum theory 
Modal interpretations of quantum mechanics were first conceived of in 1972 by Bas van Fraassen, in his paper "A formal approach to the philosophy of science". Van Fraassen introduced a distinction between a dynamical state, which describes what might be true about a system and which always evolves according to the Schrödinger equation, and a value state, which indicates what is actually true about a system at a given time. The term "modal interpretation" now is used to describe a larger set of models that grew out of this approach. The Stanford Encyclopedia of Philosophy describes several versions, including proposals by Kochen, Dieks, Clifton, Dickson, and Bub. According to Michel Bitbol, Schrödinger's views on how to interpret quantum mechanics progressed through as many as four stages, ending with a non-collapse view that in respects resembles the interpretations of Everett and van Fraassen. Because Schrödinger subscribed to a kind of post-Machian neutral monism, in which "matter" and "mind" are only different aspects or arrangements of the same common elements, treating the wavefunction as ontic and treating it as epistemic became interchangeable.

Time-symmetric theories 
Time-symmetric interpretations of quantum mechanics were first suggested by Walter Schottky in 1921. Several theories have been proposed which modify the equations of quantum mechanics to be symmetric with respect to time reversal. (See Wheeler–Feynman time-symmetric theory.)  This creates retrocausality: events in the future can affect ones in the past, exactly as events in the past can affect ones in the future.  In these theories, a single measurement cannot fully determine the state of a system (making them a type of hidden-variables theory), but given two measurements performed at different times, it is possible to calculate the exact state of the system at all intermediate times.  The collapse of the wavefunction is therefore not a physical change to the system, just a change in our knowledge of it due to the second measurement.  Similarly, they explain entanglement as not being a true physical state but just an illusion created by ignoring retrocausality.  The point where two particles appear to "become entangled" is simply a point where each particle is being influenced by events that occur to the other particle in the future.

Not all advocates of time-symmetric causality favour modifying the unitary dynamics of standard quantum mechanics. Thus a leading exponent of the two-state vector formalism, Lev Vaidman, states that the two-state vector formalism dovetails well with Hugh Everett's many-worlds interpretation.

Other interpretations 

As well as the mainstream interpretations discussed above, a number of other interpretations have been proposed which have not made a significant scientific impact for whatever reason. These range from proposals by mainstream physicists to the more occult ideas of quantum mysticism.

Comparisons 
The most common interpretations are summarized in the table below. The values shown in the cells of the table are not without controversy, for the precise meanings of some of the concepts involved are unclear and, in fact, are themselves at the center of the controversy surrounding the given interpretation. For another table comparing interpretations of quantum theory, see reference.

No experimental evidence exists that distinguishes among these interpretations. To that extent, the physical theory stands, and is consistent with itself and with reality; difficulties arise only when one attempts to "interpret" the theory.  Nevertheless, designing experiments which would test the various interpretations is the subject of active research.

Most of these interpretations have variants. For example, it is difficult to get a precise definition of the Copenhagen interpretation as it was developed and argued about by many people.

The silent approach 

Although interpretational opinions are openly and widely discussed today, that was not always the case.  A notable exponent of a tendency of silence was Paul Dirac who once wrote: "The interpretation of quantum mechanics has been dealt with by many authors, and I do not want to discuss it here. I want to deal with more fundamental things."  This position is not uncommon among practitioners of quantum mechanics.   Others, like Nico van Kampen and Willis Lamb, have openly criticized non-orthodox interpretations of quantum mechanics.

See also 

 Afshar experiment
 Bohr–Einstein debates
 Einstein's thought experiments
 Glossary of quantum philosophy
 Local hidden-variable theory
 Macroscopic quantum phenomena
 Path integral formulation
 Philosophical interpretation of classical physics
 Popper's experiment
 Superdeterminism
 Quantum foundations
 Quantum gravity
 Quantum Zeno effect

References

Sources 
 
 Rudolf Carnap, 1939, "The interpretation of physics", in Foundations of Logic and Mathematics of the International Encyclopedia of Unified Science. University of Chicago Press.
 Dickson, M., 1994, "Wavefunction tails in the modal interpretation" in Hull, D., Forbes, M., and Burian, R., eds., Proceedings of the PSA  1" 366–76. East Lansing, Michigan: Philosophy of Science Association.
 --------, and Clifton, R., 1998, "Lorentz-invariance in modal interpretations" in Dieks, D. and Vermaas, P., eds., The Modal Interpretation of Quantum Mechanics. Dordrecht: Kluwer Academic Publishers: 9–48.
 Fuchs, Christopher, 2002, "Quantum Mechanics as Quantum Information (and only a little more)". 
 -------- and A. Peres, 2000, "Quantum theory needs no 'interpretation, Physics Today.
 Herbert, N., 1985. Quantum Reality: Beyond the New Physics. New York: Doubleday. .
 Hey, Anthony, and Walters, P., 2003. The New Quantum Universe, 2nd ed. Cambridge Univ. Press. .
 
 Max Jammer, 1966. The Conceptual Development of Quantum Mechanics. McGraw-Hill.
 --------, 1974. The Philosophy of Quantum Mechanics. Wiley & Sons.
 Al-Khalili, 2003. Quantum: A Guide for the Perplexed. London: Weidenfeld & Nicolson.
 de Muynck, W. M., 2002. Foundations of quantum mechanics, an empiricist approach. Dordrecht: Kluwer Academic Publishers. .
 Roland Omnès, 1999. Understanding Quantum Mechanics. Princeton Univ. Press.
 Karl Popper, 1963. Conjectures and Refutations. London: Routledge and Kegan Paul. The chapter "Three views Concerning Human Knowledge" addresses, among other things, instrumentalism in the physical sciences.
 Hans Reichenbach, 1944. Philosophic Foundations of Quantum Mechanics. Univ. of California Press.
 
 Bas van Fraassen, 1972, "A formal approach to the philosophy of science", in R. Colodny, ed., Paradigms and Paradoxes: The Philosophical Challenge of the Quantum Domain. Univ. of Pittsburgh Press: 303–66.
 John A. Wheeler and Wojciech Hubert Zurek  (eds), Quantum Theory and Measurement, Princeton: Princeton University Press, LoC QC174.125.Q38 1983.

Further reading 
Almost all authors below are professional physicists.
 David Z Albert, 1992. Quantum Mechanics and Experience. Harvard Univ. Press. .
 John S. Bell, 1987. Speakable and Unspeakable in Quantum Mechanics. Cambridge Univ. Press, . The 2004 edition includes two additional papers and an introduction by Alain Aspect.
 Dmitrii Ivanovich Blokhintsev, 1968. The Philosophy of Quantum Mechanics. D. Reidel Publishing Company. .
 David Bohm, 1980. Wholeness and the Implicate Order. London: Routledge. .
 
 David Deutsch, 1997. The Fabric of Reality. London: Allen Lane. ; . Argues forcefully against instrumentalism. For general readers.
  Provides a pragmatic perspective on interpretations.  For general readers.
 Bernard d'Espagnat, 1976. Conceptual Foundation of Quantum Mechanics, 2nd ed. Addison Wesley. .
 Bernard d'Espagnat, 1983. In Search of Reality. Springer. .
 Bernard d'Espagnat, 2003. Veiled Reality: An Analysis of Quantum Mechanical Concepts. Westview Press.
 Bernard d'Espagnat, 2006. On Physics and Philosophy. Princeton Univ. Press.
 Arthur Fine, 1986. The Shaky Game: Einstein Realism and the Quantum Theory. Science and its Conceptual Foundations. Univ. of Chicago Press. .
 Ghirardi, Giancarlo, 2004. Sneaking a Look at God's Cards. Princeton Univ. Press.
 Gregg Jaeger (2009) Entanglement, Information, and the Interpretation of Quantum Mechanics. Springer. .
 N. David Mermin (1990) Boojums all the way through. Cambridge Univ. Press. .
 Roland Omnès, 1994. The Interpretation of Quantum Mechanics. Princeton Univ. Press. .
 Roland Omnès, 1999. Understanding Quantum Mechanics. Princeton Univ. Press.
 Roland Omnès, 1999. Quantum Philosophy: Understanding and Interpreting Contemporary Science. Princeton Univ. Press.
 Roger Penrose, 1989. The Emperor's New Mind. Oxford Univ. Press. . Especially chpt. 6.
 Roger Penrose, 1994. Shadows of the Mind. Oxford Univ. Press. .
 Roger Penrose, 2004. The Road to Reality. New York: Alfred A. Knopf. Argues that quantum theory is incomplete.
 Lee Phillips, 2017. A brief history of quantum alternatives. Ars Technica.

External links 

 Stanford Encyclopedia of Philosophy:
 "Bohmian mechanics" by Sheldon Goldstein.
 "Collapse Theories." by Giancarlo Ghirardi.
 "Copenhagen Interpretation of Quantum Mechanics" by Jan Faye.
 "Everett's Relative State Formulation of Quantum Mechanics" by Jeffrey Barrett.
 "Many-Worlds Interpretation of Quantum Mechanics" by Lev Vaidman.
 "Modal Interpretation of Quantum Mechanics" by Michael Dickson and Dennis Dieks.
 "Philosophical Issues in Quantum Theory" by Wayne Myrvold.
 "Quantum-Bayesian and Pragmatist Views of Quantum Theory" by Richard Healey.
 "Quantum Entanglement and Information" by Jeffrey Bub.
 "Quantum mechanics" by Jenann Ismael.
 "Quantum Logic and Probability Theory" by Alexander Wilce.
 "Relational Quantum Mechanics" by Federico Laudisa and Carlo Rovelli.
 "The Role of Decoherence in Quantum Mechanics" by Guido Bacciagaluppi.
 Internet Encyclopedia of Philosophy:
"Interpretations of Quantum Mechanics" by Peter J. Lewis.
"Everettian Interpretations of Quantum Mechanics" by Christina Conroy.

 
 
Epistemology
Philosophy of physics
Philosophical debates
Reality